The following Confederate States Army units and commanders fought in the Battle of Williamsburg of the American Civil War. The Union order of battle is shown separately.

Abbreviations used

Military rank
 LTG = Lieutenant General
 MG = Major General
 BG = Brigadier General
 Col = Colonel
 Ltc = Lieutenant Colonel
 Maj = Major
 Cpt = Captain
 Lt = Lieutenant
 Bvt = Brevet Rank

Other
 w = wounded
 mw = mortally wounded
 k = killed

Army of Northern Virginia

Gen Joseph E. Johnston 
Commanding in the field: MG James Longstreet

Notes

References
 Hastings, Earl C. and David S. Hastings. A Pitiless Rain: The Battle of Williamsburg, 1862. Shippensburg, Pennsylvania; White Mane Publishing Company, 1997. 
 
 Robert Underwood Johnson, Clarence Clough Buell, Battles and Leaders of the Civil War, Volume 2 (Pdf), New York: The Century Co., 1887.

American Civil War orders of battle